Tillakaratne Mudiyanselage Dilshan (born 14 October 1976), commonly known as TM Dilshan is a former Sri Lankan cricketer and former captain of the Sri Lanka national cricket team. He is often regarded as the best rated Sri Lankan player in run-chases in ODI history and one of the most innovative players of all time. Dilshan is considered to be a rare example of a cricketer with notable skills in all aspects of the game, who can bat, bowl, field and keep wicket. He is an aggressive right-hand batsman who invented the scoop, which has come to be known as the Dilscoop, a shot that hits the ball over the keeper. Apart from being an opening batsman, he is also a capable off-break bowler. Energetic in the field, he usually fielded at the point region.

Dilshan made his Test and ODI debut during the Sri Lankan cricket team's tour to Zimbabwe in 1999. He is also the second cap for Sri Lanka in Twenty20 Internationals. He is the first cricketer in the history of the game to score hundreds in all formats as a captain.

Dilshan won the Twenty20 International Performance of the Year award at the 2009 ICC Awards for his 96 off 57 ball shots against West Indies in the semi-final of the 2009 ICC World Twenty20 in England. He also won the man of the series trophy for his individual batting performances in the 2009 ICC World Twenty20 tournament. He was also a key member of the team that won the 2014 ICC World Twenty20 and was part of the team that made the finals of 2007 Cricket World Cup, 2011 Cricket World Cup, 2009 ICC World Twenty20 and 2012 ICC World Twenty20.

He is the fourth Sri Lankan, and eleventh player overall to score 10,000 ODI runs. Being the third overall and first Sri Lankan to score 1,500 runs in Twenty20 Internationals, he is also the first player to hit 200 fours in T20Is. Dilshan scored 1000 or more ODI runs in a calendar year four times and never failed to amass fewer than 800 runs in any calendar year between 2009 and 2015.

Dilshan was under-estimated in the cricket world as an ordinary player when he batted at number 6 and 7, unlike his revered teammates Mahela Jayawardene and Kumar Sangakkara. When he gained the opening batting position, Dilshan became one of the finest cricketers in the world and a legend in modern cricketing history. His quick progression can be seen in his stats: after he moved to the opening position, he scored 21 ODI centuries and all his Test and T20I centuries.

In August 2016, Dilshan announced that he would retire from both ODI and T20I cricket at the end of the series against Australia. He retired from ODI cricket on 28 August 2016 and from T20I cricket on 9 September 2016.

Early life and family
Dilshan was born on 14 October 1976 in Kalutara, to a Malay father and a Sinhalese mother in a family with five siblings. He was educated at Jaffna Sinhala Madya Maha Vidyalaya in Jaffna for primary education, and then at the Kalutara Vidyalaya, where he started his cricket career as a teenager. However, his family did not want him to play cricket, so his only goal was to get ahead in sports. Dilshan converted from Islam to Buddhism at the age of 16, and was known as Tuwan Mohammad Dilshan before his conversion. His childhood coach Ranjan Paranavitana stated that even though Dilshan had a Muslim name, he and his siblings followed their mother's religion during their childhood and officially changed his religion and name after his parents separated.

Dilshan was married to Nilanka Vithanage, with whom he has a son called Resadu Tillakaratne. After divorcing Dilshan, Nilanka filed a lawsuit over child alimony. He was issued with a notice to appear in court after the 2011 Cricket World Cup, but he refused some of these notices. The case was later settled with Dilshan to pay about 200,000 LKR each month for his ex-wife and his son.

The court case was opened again in 2017, after Dilshan had failed to pay some of the monthly fees. On 24 April 2017, Colombo Magistrate Courts issued an arrest warrant to Dilshan due to his absence in the Court. However, Dilshan finally appeared on court on 25 April 2017.

Dilshan is now married to Sri Lankan actress Manjula Thilini. Their marriage was celebrated in India during the 2008 IPL series. Dilshan has two daughters and two sons from this marriage. Their eldest daughter is Resandi Linama Tillakaratne, and second is Lasadi Dihasansa Tillakaratne. Their elder son is Dihela Dinhath Tillakaratne, and younger son was born in 2017.

Dilshan's brother, Tillakaratne Sampath, is a first-class cricketer in Sri Lanka.

Dilshan is a popular icon at home, and participated in many local events and television programs. He was also appointed as a special judge in Sirasa Superstar, Generation 4. He also participated in a number of entertainment shows, due to his wife's status as a popular Sri Lankan actress.

With the invention of his masterstroke play-Dilscoop, Dilshan models his fashion line with the name 'Dil Scoop'.

On 23 October 2014, Dilshan opened a small-scale luxury hotel, named as "Hotel 'D Pavilion Inn'", situated at Stafford Lane in Kirulapana. The hotel was opened in the presence of the former president of Sri Lanka, Mahinda Rajapakse.

After retiring from international cricket, Dilshan and his wife released a video song titled Hema Sansaraye. In February 2021, he released the music video Hitha Hadana Kena.

Dilshan made his television debut in an episode of Kopi Kade drama on 5 April 2017.  He also acts alongside his wife in the teleplay Mithuu which is currently broadcast by Independent Television Network. and was one of the three judges of Sri Lanka's Got Talent reality program conducted by Sirasa TV.

Early career
Dilshan first played against Zimbabwe on 18 November 1999 at Bulawayo. He scored 9 runs on his debut and was out LBW to a delivery off Henry Olonga. However, Dilshan managed to score his maiden test century at the Harare Sports Club in the second test between Sri Lanka and Zimbabwe. He scored an unbeaten 163 runs in the first innings and was awarded the player of the match award for his role in the Sri Lankan victory. Dilshan achieved his highest test score in England, where he scored 193 runs in the second test at the Lord's cricket ground, against England.

Dilshan's One-Day International debut also came during Sri Lanka's tour of Zimbabwe in 1999, where he scored 31 runs against Zimbabwe. His maiden ODI century came against Netherlands on 4 July 2006, where he smashed an unbeaten 117 runs along with Sanath Jayasuriya's 157 to help Sri Lanka post then highest ODI score of 443 runs, which stood for 10 years until England scored 444 runs.

Dilshan real talent came through in their match against India on 15 December 2009, where Sri Lanka nearly chased a mammoth target of 414 posted by India. The pitch at Rajkot was perfect to bat on, Dilshan started the run chase with Tharanga, instead of Jayasuriya. In a blistering knock he reached fifty off 38 balls and then scored hundred off 73 balls. His 150 runs came off 115 balls with Sri Lanka on the brink of a sensational win. His score of 160 was full of hooks, pulls and many scoops of his variety, leading the way to victory. But after Dilshan fell when bowled by Harbhajan Singh, the match opened for the Indian team. They took all the advantages and Sri Lanka were bowled out for 411 runs, losing by only 3 runs. This was Dilshan's third century in ODIs, the commentators described it as one of the best chases in the World Cricket. His knock was later nominated to be one of the Best ODI Batting Performance of the year by ESPN Cricinfo.

He was named in the 'Team of the Tournament' by ESPN Cricinfo for the 2009 T20I World Cup. His knock of 96* against West Indies was later nominated to be one of the Best T20I Batting Performance of the year by ESPN Cricinfo.

For his performances in 2009, he was named in the World ODI XI by the ICC.

Later career

Dilshan played almost all his international matches as a middle-order all-round batsman during his early years. However, by 2007, he was selected to open the batting with Sanath Jayasuriya in ODI game against India, where he started to showcase himself as an attacking and threatening opening batsman. Since 2007, his strokeplay has included a host of aggressive strokes which has allowed him to dominate the ODI arena on many occasions. Until retirement, he slotted as the permanent opening batsman for Sri Lanka, as well as operating as a handy right-arm off-break bowler in both ODI and T20I matches.

Dilshan is credited for the creation of the Dilscoop, which he stumbled upon and then perfected, during the Indian Premier League 2009 tournament. His innovative stroke play is acknowledged by many commentators and pundits thereby earning the recognition of being known as one of the most aggressive batsmen of all time. Apart from his Dilscoop, Dilshan is a prolific player of width possessing the ability to hit nearly any delivery pitched outside the off-stump for runs, and has perfected a lethal cover drive against pace bowlers.

2011 Cricket World Cup
Dilshan was the top run scorer in the 2011 Cricket World Cup. He scored 500 runs from nine One Day international innings with the best score of 144 runs against Zimbabwe. In the quarter-final against England, Dilshan along with Upul Tharanga, stood double hundred partnerships for the first wicket. This stands as the best ever chasing in a quarterfinal in a World Cup game. He scored two centuries, two half-centuries, 61 boundaries, and four sixes during the tournament which ended at the Wankhede Stadium in Mumbai, India, in April 2011.

He was named in the 'Team of the Tournament' for the 2011 World Cup by the ICC and Cricinfo.

Captaincy
Immediately after the end of the ICC Cricket World Cup 2011, with Kumar Sangakkara stepping down as captain, Dilshan was appointed the captain of Sri Lanka in all formats of the game. Dilshan said after his retirement in ODIs that, he did not want to take the captaincy, but Sri Lanka Cricket asked him to take the captaincy for six months until they found someone suitable. He accepted the task, but the many troubles in the team such as retirements and injuries led him to reduce performances.

However, his appointment as captain was questioned by cricket fans and pundits alike. Many wondered if he was the right man to lead Sri Lanka. Dilshan scored 193 runs against England at Lord's, breaking the record for the highest individual score made by a Sri Lankan at the venue, and lead Sri Lanka to their maiden test win in South Africa. Losses to England, Australia, Pakistan and South Africa put strain on his captaincy, however, which he relinquished in January 2012.

He also said that he had a lack of support during captaincy tenure and help from former captains and coaches for the team. During Dilshan's captaincy, four coaches were introduced, but none succeeded.

Dilshan became the 5th player in international cricket to score centuries in all forms of the game. During the Australian tour of Sri Lanka in 2011, Dilshan scored an unbeaten century of 104* from just 54 balls in the first Twenty20 match of the series, becoming the 5th player to achieve the milestone after West Indian Chris Gayle, New Zealander Brendon McCullum, Indian Suresh Raina and fellow Sri Lankan Mahela Jayawardena and it is also the highest individual twenty20 international score by a Sri Lankan in the history. He scored the century from just 57 balls with 12 fours and 5 sixes. He achieved his century with a dilscoop hitting behind the wicket-keeper.

For his performances in 2011, he was named in the World ODI XI by the ICC. For his performances in 2013, he was named in the World ODI XI by the ICC.

In December 2011, Sri Lanka registered their first ever Test win in South Africa. This also became their first Test win under Dilshan's captaincy. However, after losing the Test series 2–1 and the subsequent ODI series 3–2, Dilshan resigned and was replaced by Mahela Jayawardene. In 2012, he was ranked the second-highest ODI run scorer, with 1119 runs, behind his teammate Kumar Sangakkara. For his performances in 2012, he was named in the ODI XI of the year by Cricinfo.

Test retirement
Dilshan announced his retirement from Test cricket on 9 October 2013. Dilshan retired from test cricket in 2013 with his last match being played against Bangladesh at the R. Premadasa Stadium. Dilshan played 87 test matches amassing 5,492 runs, along with 16 centuries and 39 wickets.

Dilshan-Shehzad incident
On 4 September 2014, the Pakistan Cricket Board (PCB) issued Pakistani cricketer Ahmed Shehzad an official reprimand after his frequent quarrels with Dilshan about Dilshan's past and current religions. Shehzad was caught on camera telling Dilshan:

Through the ranks
On 16 December 2014, in his 300th One-Day International, Dilshan scored his 18th ODI century and also passed 9,000 runs in ODIs. He became the fourth Sri Lankan cricketer and 15th overall to achieve this landmark. He also took 3 crucial wickets in the match against England and aided Sri Lanka's title claim as the winners of the tournament. He won both man of the match award and man of the series award.

On 23 January 2015, Dilshan scored his 20th One-Day International century against New Zealand, becoming the 10th batsmen to score 20 ODI centuries.

2015 Cricket World Cup
On 26 February 2015, he scored an unbeaten 161 runs during the group stage match of 2015 ICC Cricket World Cup against Bangladesh. This was his highest individual score in an ODI and was the highest score by a Sri Lankan in Cricket World Cup history, a title previously held by Aravinda de Silva, who scored 145 runs against Kenya in 1996. It was also the highest individual score without a six in ODI history and Dilshan's third score greater than 150. During his innings, he shared a 206* run second wicket partnership with Kumar Sangakkara. This was the highest second wicket partnership for Sri Lanka in ODIs, but was surpassed in the following match between Sri Lanka and England by a 212* run stand between Sangakkara and Lahiru Thirimanne.

On 1 March 2015, during a group match against England, Dilshan took his 100th ODI wicket by dismissing Gary Ballance off his own bowling, thus becoming the third Sri Lankan to score 3000 runs and take 100 wickets after Jayasuriya and Aravinda.

During a group match against Australia, Dilshan scored 24 runs off a Mitchell Johnson over by hitting six consecutive 4s, a first in World Cup history.

Dilshan's teammates, Sangakkara and Mahela, retired from ODI cricket following Sri Lanka's loss to South Africa in the quarterfinals. When asked about retirement, Dilshan stated that until Sri Lanka found a good opening batsman he would continue to feature in the shorter forms of the game for about 2 years or so. Dilshan got out without scoring in the quarterfinals and Sri Lanka exited the World Cup without making the semifinals for the first time since 2003.

Post-World Cup
On 26 July 2015, Dilshan passed 10,000 ODI runs during the fifth ODI against Pakistan at Hambantota. With this, he became the fourth Sri Lankan and eleventh overall to achieve the milestone.

Dilshan was the second person after Sanath Jayasuriya to score more than 4000 ODI runs after the age of 35 and surpassed Jayasuriya's record of 4,142 runs in 2015. Until retirement, Dilshan has scored 4,674 ODI runs after the age of 35, most by a player.

On 9 November 2015, Dilshan became the highest run scorer for Sri Lanka in Twenty20 Internationals passing 1,493 runs of Mahela Jayawardena. With this feat, Dilshan also became the first Sri Lankan and third overall to pass 1,500 T20I runs, milestone achieved after Brendan McCullum, and JP Duminy. Until his retirement, he was only behind McCullum by runs in T20Is.

During the third ODI against New Zealand on 31 December 2015, Dilshan smashed 91 runs to reach another milestone in his career. Dilshan surpassed 1202 runs by Jayasuriya as most runs by an opening batsman for Sri Lanka in a calendar year. Dilshan scored 1207 runs in the year 2015 with 4 hundreds and 6 fifties.

Dilshan finished 2015 ODI arena as the highest ODI run scorer for Sri Lanka and third highest of all-time list. During 25 ODIs played in 2015, Dilshan scored 1,207 runs with the average of 52.47 and strike rate of 90.75. The veteran of 39 years of age, Dilshan showcased incredible all-around ability and had no mercy for the bowlers for all nations, got 4 hundreds and 6 fifties. Until retirement in August, Dilshan has surpassed more than 800 runs each in four consecutive years from 2012 to 2015. For his performances in 2015, he was named in the World ODI XI by ICC.

Dilshan was not totally successful in 2016 Asia Cup, where Sri Lanka lost to Bangladesh and India lost the way to the finals. On 4 March 2016, against Pakistan, Dilshan reached another milestone by hitting 200 fours in all twenty20 internationals and the first player to break 200 fours in T20Is.

Dilshan's consistency as the leading run scorer for Sri Lanka in Twenty20 cricket proved in the 2016 ICC World Twenty20, when he scored unbeaten 83 runs against Afghanistan in a pool match. The innings reached by Afghanistan was 153 and, Dilshan started the innings with showers of four and sixes in a consecutive manner in first six overs. Sri Lanka reached the winning moment in the 19th over with 6 wickets in hand, courtesy of man of the match performance by Dilshan. After that innings, in rest of the pool matches against West Indies and England, Dilshan got out by poor umpire decisions and Sri Lanka eliminated from the first round. Dilshan finished his last international major event as the highest scorer for Sri Lanka with 133 runs at an average of 44.33.

Limited over retirement
Dilshan was not included in the England tour in 2016; which was due to his personal reasons. But, some local media stated that, the conflict between Dilshan and Sri Lanka Cricket board for his retirement consideration was the actual cause for the refuse for England tour. However, Dilshan denied these rumors. On 25 August 2016, Dilshan announced his retirement from the international arena after the Australian tour. The news stated that, due to immense pressure exerted by the selection committee to reform the limited over squad for upcoming World Cup, the team should have many immediate challenges to do. This forced Dilshan to announce and speed up his intentions to retire from limited overs.

Many Sri Lankan cricketers wished Dilshan and spoke about him as:

He played his last ODI at Rangiri Dambulla Stadium on 28 August 2016. He scored 42 runs in his last ODI innings. As said by skipper Angelo Mathews, the match was dedicated to Dilshan, and a win could give him a good farewell. The ground was covered by many tributes to Dilshan highlighting that "A member of 10,000 run club, A legacy of the Dilscoop", "What a Run", "Dilshan You Have Made Us Proud", and "Thank You Dilshan". However, Sri Lanka lost the match by 2 wickets at the end. Until his retirement from ODIs, Dilshan is the 11th highest ODI scorer of all time and 7th highest century maker of all time.

He played his last Twenty20 International at R Premadasa Stadium on 9 September 2016. He got out for a just single run in the match, but his fielding and bowling came back to the highest level. He took 2 crucial wickets at the end of the Australian innings, by ending 17 years of cricketing career. He ended his international career with a wicket off his last ball. At the time of his retirement, Dilshan was the second highest T20I run scorer of all time. Commentators summarized his career with the quote "Legends Never Retires".

Road Safety World Series
In 2020, Dilshan was announced as the captain of Sri Lanka Legends for the charity T20 cricket tournament titled 2020–21 Road Safety World Series. In the first match against Australia Legends, Dilshan scored 14 runs took 3 wickets, where Sri Lanka Legends won the match by 6 runs. Dilshan won the man of the match award. In the second match, Indian Legends beat Sri Lankan Legends by 5 wickets. However, Sri Lanka Legends later won all the league matches against West Indies, Bangladesh, England and South Africa and became the first team to reach semi finals. Dilshan became the anchor man in every game, where he scored fifties against South Africa and England Legends. In the semi final against South African Legends, Sri Lanka won the match comfortably and reached the finals. In the final against Indian Legends, Sri Lanka had the momentum to chase the total of 181 posted by Indians, but later fell 14 runs short. However, Dilshan became the Player of the Series due to his allround match winning performances. Dishan is the highest run scorer of the tournament with 271 runs and highest wicket taker with 12 wickets. He also hit the most boundaries (47) in the tournament.

Beyond cricket
On 1 August 2015, Dilshan and fellow Sri Lankan cricketer Muttiah Muralitharan were appointed as the brand ambassadors for the Presidential Task Force to combat kidney disease by the President Maithripala Sirisena.

Politics
Dilshan publicly displayed his support to Mahinda Rajapaksa at the 2015 Presidential Election. He did so by welcoming Mahinda Rajapakse to Maharagama for an election rally. In 2018, Dilshan announced that he had joined Mahinda Rajapaksa's Sri Lanka Podujana Peramuna party.

In 2018, Dilshan praised the president, Maithripala Sirisena for deciding to implement the Death penalty for drug traffickers.
"Not only for drugs, it should be implemented for child abuse and rape cases", he said, adding that the decision should have been made a long time ago.

International records and achievements

Test matches
 He has the highest score scored in Lord's Cricket Ground by a Sri Lankan, where he scored 193 runs in 2013.
 Highest partnership for the fifth wicket – 280 by Tillakaratne Dilshan and Thilan Samaraweera against Bangladesh in 2005.
 Only Sri Lankan to scored centuries in both innings in his 50th Test.

One-Day Internationals
 Most runs as an opener for Sri Lanka in a calendar year – 1207 runs in 2015.

Twenty20 Internationals
 Highest run scorer for Sri Lanka – 1,889 runs in 80 matches.
 At the time he retired he was the second-leading run scorer in T20I matches.
 Highest individual score in T20I by a Sri Lankan – 104 not out against Australia in 2011.
 He has the most catches in T20Is by a Sri Lankan – 31 in 80 matches.
 Highest partnership for the first wicket – 124 with Sanath Jayasuriya against West Indies in 2009.
 Highest partnership for the fourth wicket – 104 unbroken with Jeevan Mendis against Australia in 2011.

World Cups
 Highest individual score by a Sri Lankan – 161 not out against Bangladesh in 2015.
 Highest opening partnership – 282 with Upul Tharanga against Zimbabwe in 2011.

International centuries

Dilshan has 16 Test centuries, 22 One-Day International centuries, and 1 Twenty20 International century. He is the first cricketer in the history to score centuries in all formats as a captain. He is the second Sri Lankan and fifth overall to achieve international centuries in all forms of the game. Dilshan has scored 39 centuries (100 or more runs) in Test matches, One Day International (ODI) matches and Twenty20 International (T20I), organized by the International Cricket Council. Dilshan has scored 16 centuries in Test matches and 22 centuries in ODIs, and one in T20Is.

Dilshan scored his 16th and last Test century on 18 March 2013 at the Galle International Stadium in Galle against Bangladesh. His 17th ODI century comes in his favorite ground Pallekele International Cricket Stadium on 28 July 2013 against South Africa, where at this ground he scored 5 ODI centuries and also his only Twenty20 International century against Australia on 6 August 2011.

In Test matches, Dilshan has scored centuries against all the Test cricket playing nations except South Africa and West Indies, and has scored 150 against four of them. He is seventh on the list of leading Test century makers for Sri Lanka. His centuries have been scored at ten cricket grounds, six of which were outside Sri Lanka. He has been dismissed two times in the nineties.

In ODIs, Dilshan has scored centuries against all test playing opponents except West Indies. His maiden century was made against Netherlands at the VRA Cricket Ground, Amstelveen in 2006. He is third in the list of leading century-makers in ODIs for Sri Lanka. Of these 22 ODI centuries, nine were scored at home grounds and thirteen were at away (opposition's home) or neutral venues. He has been dismissed one time in the ninetynine.

Dilshan scored his only T20I century against Australia in 2011, and became the fifth batsmen to score hundreds in all forms of the game. He scored 104 runs from 57 balls. This is the highest individual score by a Sri Lankan in Twenty20 Internationals.

Acting career

Filmography

Television

Awards and honours
 ICC Twenty20 International Performance of the Year 2009
 ICC ODI Team of the Year – included in four years (2009, 2011, 2013, 2015)
 Dialog SLC People's Player of the Year 2015 (with 493,196 votes)
 Dialog SLC T20 Batsman of the Year 2015

References

Further reading
 The decision that changed my career – Dilshan
 Dilshan: The Man Behind The Scoop

External links

 
 Dilshan IPL Profile from RoyalChallengers

1976 births
Basnahira cricketers
Basnahira Cricket Dundee cricketers
Basnahira South cricketers
Bloomfield Cricket and Athletic Club cricketers
Converts to Buddhism from Islam
Cricketers at the 2007 Cricket World Cup
Cricketers at the 2011 Cricket World Cup
Cricketers at the 2015 Cricket World Cup
Delhi Capitals cricketers
Dhaka Dominators cricketers
Guyana Amazon Warriors cricketers
Living people
North Central Province cricketers
Northern Districts cricketers
People from Western Province, Sri Lanka
Royal Challengers Bangalore cricketers
Sebastianites Cricket and Athletic Club cricketers
Sinhalese sportspeople
Sri Lankan Buddhists
Sri Lankan former Muslims
Sri Lankan Malays
Sri Lanka One Day International cricketers
Sri Lanka Test cricketers
Sri Lanka Twenty20 International cricketers
Sri Lanka Test cricket captains
Surrey cricketers
Sydney Thunder cricketers
Derbyshire cricketers
Hambantota Troopers cricketers
Southern Express cricketers
Chattogram Challengers cricketers